Bittiolum is a genus of sea snails, marine gastropod mollusks in the family Cerithiidae.

Species
Species within the genus Bittiolum include:

 Bittiolum alternatum (Say, 1822)
 Bittiolum varium (Pfeiffer, 1840)

References

External links

Cerithiidae